"I'm So Beautiful" is a single by American performance artist Divine, released in 1984. The song also appeared on the compilation album The Story So Far, released the same year.

Chart performance
"I'm So Beautiful" debuted on the UK Singles Chart at #58 before climbing to and peaking at #52 in its second week.  The song spent a total of two weeks on the chart.

"I'm So Beautiful" fared better in Germany where it peaked at #38 and spent a total of 9 weeks on the German Singles Chart.

Track listings
German Vinyl, 7-inch single
 "I'm So Beautiful" - 3:40
 "Show Me Around" - 3:20

UK Vinyl, 12-inch single
 "I'm So Beautiful (Mix)" - 7:40
 "I'm So Beautiful (Divine Mix)" - 6:21
 "Show Me Around" - 3:13

Music video
In the music video for "I'm So Beautiful," Divine is seen dancing and singing in a hall of mirrors.  The video includes several black-and-white scenes of Snow White and the Seven Dwarfs as lawn ornaments.

Charts

In Australia, "I'm So Beautiful" missed the Kent Music Report top 100 singles chart, but was listed as one of the singles receiving significant sales reports beyond the top 100 for 4 weeks in January and February 1985; with its highest ranking being first on this list.

References

1984 singles
Divine (performer) songs
Songs written by Matt Aitken
Songs written by Mike Stock (musician)
1984 songs